HMNZS Pukaki is a Lake-class inshore patrol vessel inshore patrol boat of the Royal New Zealand Navy. Pukaki was launched in Whangarei Harbour on 6 May 2008. Its primary duties included border and fisheries protection patrols, surveillance, boarding operations and search and rescue response.

Pukaki was the third ship of this name to serve in the Royal New Zealand Navy and is named after Lake Pukaki.

Pukaki was decommissioned at Devonport Naval Base on 17 October 2019. Regulatory changes in 2012 resulted in operating restrictions around speed and sea states being imposed on them. Subsequently the RNZN assessed them as no longer being suited to the heavy seas typically encountered off New Zealand and further afield.

In 2022, Pukaki, along with her sister , was sold to Ireland for use by the Irish Naval Service.

See also
 Patrol boats of the Royal New Zealand Navy

References

External links

 Official RNZN Website
 

Protector-class inshore patrol vessels
Patrol vessels of New Zealand
Ships built in New Zealand
2008 ships